Kaluđerovo is a village in Serbia. It is situated in the Bela Crkva municipality, in the South Banat District, Vojvodina province. The village has a Serb ethnic majority (98.48%) and a population of 132 people (2002 census). This is also a village which lies on the border of Serbia and Romania.

References

External links
 Kaluđerovo

Populated places in Serbian Banat
Populated places in South Banat District
Bela Crkva
Romania–Serbia border crossings